The 2004 United States presidential election in Georgia took place on November 2, 2004. Voters chose 15 representatives, or electors to the Electoral College, who voted for president and vice president.

Georgia was won by incumbent President George W. Bush by a 16.60% margin of victory. Prior to the election, all 12 news organizations considered this a state Bush would win, or otherwise a red state. Bush performed almost five points better than he did in 2000. He also won a wide majority of the counties and congressional districts. The results of the state were similar to other states in the South, such as Alabama, Mississippi, Tennessee, Kentucky, and Louisiana. Like those states, the exit polling showed racial polarization as Bush dominated among white voters, which made up almost 70% of the vote, and Kerry dominated among African American voters, which made up 30% of the state's population. Software engineer and talk show host Michael Badnarik (L-TX) would finish third in the popular vote in Georgia, getting 0.56% of the vote, one of his best statewide performances in the nation.

As of 2020, this remains the last time that Georgia has been decided by a double-digit margin in a presidential election. Bush is also the only Republican ever to win Georgia twice with Georgia also being 1 of 10 states to consecutively back George W. Bush to only support George H. W. Bush once.  This is also the first time that Georgia voted Republican three elections in a row.

Primaries 
2004 Georgia Democratic primary

Campaign

Predictions

There were 12 news organizations that made state-by-state predictions of the election. Here are their last predictions before election day.

Polling

Bush won every single pre-election poll and won each by a double-digit margin of victory and with over 50% of the vote. The final 3 polls averaged Bush leading 56% to 41%.

Fundraising
Bush raised $6,656,076. Kerry raised $2,282,977.

Advertising and visits
Neither campaign advertised or visited this state during the fall election.

Analysis 
Like other Deep South states during the 2004 election, the political demographics of Georgia was based more around the racial majority in each county, with white Georgians voting more Republican and black Georgians voting more Democratic. Democratic dominance in the state occurred in mostly black-majority counties in the region as well the urban center of the city of Atlanta (located mostly in central Fulton County) along with its core suburban counties of Clayton and DeKalb. Athens-Clarke County, home of the University of Georgia, also supported Kerry's bid, largely as a consequence of being a college town with traditionally left-leaning political views. Since just about every other part of Georgia had a majority white population, Republican dominance occurred in just about every other part of the state including suburban Atlanta where a significant portion of the state's population resides. Suburban Atlanta also includes northern Fulton County (the former Milton County area) which despite being part of this heavily urban and majority-minority county, is predominantly-White, suburban, and perhaps the most affluent area in the state of Georgia. This area also voted heavily in favor of Republican presidential incumbent George W. Bush.

In other down ballot races, Republicans gained Georgia's Class III U.S. Senate seat which was then held by Zell Miller (D) with Johnny Isakson's (R) victory in the open seat race to succeed him and also gained control of the Georgia House of Representatives, and thus control of both houses of the Georgia General Assembly (having already gained control of the Georgia State Senate in 2002), for the first time since Reconstruction. However, despite these achievements, Democrats gained one of Georgia's U.S. House seats with John Barrow's (D) victory over incumbent Representative Max Burns (R).

, this is the last election in which the Metro Atlanta counties of Douglas, Rockdale, and Newton—now Democratic strongholds—voted Republican. This is also the last time the Black Belt counties of Baldwin, Sumter, and Washington voted Republican and the last in which Webster County voted Democratic, as well as the last election in which Georgia was decided by a double-digit margin.

Results 

(*Tancredo was not the Republican Party's nominee in 2004.)

By county

Counties that flipped from Democratic to Republican 
 Burke (largest municipality: Waynesboro)
 Chattahoochee (largest municipality: Cusseta)
 McIntosh (largest municipality: Darien)
 Meriwether (largest municipality: Manchester)
 Mitchell (largest municipality: Camilla)
 Peach (largest municipality: Fort Valley)
 Telfair (largest municipality: McRae-Helena)
 Washington (largest municipality: Sandersville)
 Wilkinson (largest municipality: Gordon)

Counties that flipped from Republican to Democratic
 Chatham (largest municipality: Savannah)

By congressional district
Bush won 9 of 13 congressional districts, including two held by Democrats.

Electors 

Technically the voters of Georgia cast their ballots for electors: representatives to the Electoral College. Georgia is allocated 15 electors because it has 13 congressional districts and 2 senators. All candidates who appear on the ballot or qualify to receive write-in votes must submit a list of 15 electors, who pledge to vote for their candidate and his or her running mate. Whoever wins the majority of votes in the state is awarded all 15 electoral votes. Their chosen electors then vote for president and vice president. Although electors are pledged to their candidate and running mate, they are not obligated to vote for them. An elector who votes for someone other than his or her candidate is known as a faithless elector.

The electors of each state and the District of Columbia met on December 13, 2004, to cast their votes for president and vice president. The Electoral College itself never meets as one body. Instead the electors from each state and the District of Columbia met in their respective capitols.

The following were the members of the Electoral College from the state. All were pledged to and voted for George W. Bush and Dick Cheney.

 Anna R. Cablik
 Fred Cooper
 Nancy N. Coverdell
 James C. Edenfield
 Karen Handel
 Donald F. Layfield
 Carolyn Dodgen Meadows
 Sunny K. Park
 Alec Poitevint
 Joan Ransom
 Nardender G. Reddy
 Jame Raynolds
 Norma Mountain Rogers
 Eric Tanenblatt
 Virgil Williams

References 

Georgia
2004
2004 Georgia (U.S. state) elections